Mathias-Stinnes-Stadion is a multi-use stadium in Essen, Germany. It is currently used mostly for football matches. The stadium has a capacity of 12,000 people. In 1956 it was used as venue for the first unofficial fixture of a German female national team.

References

Football venues in Germany
Sport in Essen
Sports venues in North Rhine-Westphalia
Buildings and structures in Essen